The 2005–06 All-Ireland Junior B Club Hurling Championship was the inaugural staging of the All-Ireland Junior B Club Hurling Championship since its establishment by the Killeedy GAA Club. The championship ran from 12 February to 2 April 2006.

The All-Ireland final was played on 2 April 2006 at Páirc Íde Naofa, between St. Lachtain's and St. James', in what was their first ever meeting in the final. St. Lachtain's won the match by 2–18 to 3–08 to claim their first ever All-Ireland title.

Munster Junior B Club Hurling Championship

Munster quarter-final

Munster semi-finals

Munster final

All-Ireland Junior B Club Hurling Championship

All-Ireland semi-finals

All-Ireland final

References

All-Ireland Junior B Club Hurling Championship
All-Ireland Junior B Club Hurling Championship
All-Ireland Junior Club Hurling Championship